The mayor of Cincinnati, Ohio, is elected directly in a nonpartisan election separate from the City Council election. Until 2001, the candidate who received the most votes in the City Council election would become mayor. Mayoral candidates in the general election are chosen in an open primary.

Bold type indicates winner. Italic type indicates incumbent.

Primary elections
As of 2001, the mayor of Cincinnati, Ohio, is elected directly in a separate election. Prior to that, it was the candidate who received the most votes in the city council election. Candidates in the general election are chosen in an open primary. in 2013, John Cranley (D), defeated Roxanne Qualls (D).

Italic type indicates incumbent.

Notes and references

Mayoral elections in Cincinnati